The White Storm is a Hong Kong action film series of three films. The films are unrelated to one another in storyline but feature common central themes involving drug trafficking, brotherhood and the Narcotics Bureau of the Hong Kong Police Force. The first film, The White Storm, written and directed by Benny Chan and starring Sean Lau, Louis Koo and Nick Cheung was released in 2013. The second film, The White Storm 2: Drug Lords, written and directed by Herman Yau and starring Andy Lau and Koo was released in 2019. An upcoming third film, The White Storm 3: Heaven or Hell also written and directed by Yau and starring Koo, Sean Lau and Aaron Kwok is set for release in 2023.

Films

The White Storm (2013)

The White Storm is the first film in the series, which tells the story of three childhood friends Ma Ho-tin, So Kin-chow and Cheung Chi-wai who are police officers of the Narcotics Bureau of the Hong Kong Police Force, with Kin-chow going undercover to infiltrate drug dealers while Ho-tin and Chi-wai back him up. The trio has solved numerous cases over the years. After of years of investigation, they finally have the chance to crack down Thai drug lord Eight-Faced Buddha's den. During their face-off, the trio were ambushed by the Eight-Faced Buddha, who captures Kin-chow and Chi-wai while Ho-tin holds Eight-Faced Buddha's daughter, Mina, hostage and Ho-tin is forced to choose only one of his friends to leave with him alive.

The White Storm 2: Drug Lords (2019)

The White Storm 2: Drug Lords is a thematic sequel in-title-only to The White Storm. In the quadripartite drug market in Hong Kong, drug dealer Jizo (Louis Koo) gradually expands in collaboration with some Mexican drug lords across the border, followed by a chain of dog-eat-dog events which shock and bring the whole trade on high alert. On the other hand, Yu Shun-tin (Andy Lau), a former triad member who is now a financial tycoon, is offering a bounty to eliminate the number one drug dealer in Hong Kong, which causes a stir in society. Police officer Fung (Michael Miu) intends to arrest Jizo, but is now responsible for protecting Jizo instead due to the bounty. A final battle has broken out between the two tycoons who were once lesser-known brothers from the same triad.

The White Storm 3: Heaven or Hell (TBD)

The White Storm 3: Heaven or Hell is a thematic sequel in-title-only to The White Storm 2: Drug Lords. During a drug raid operation led by Narcotics Bureau officer Au Chi-yuen, undercover officer Cheung Kin-hang was wounded in a gunfight and was rescued by drug Hong So-chai. While rehabilitating from his wound in Thailand, Cheung meets a girl named Noon, and plans to bring her back to Hong Kong, however, at this time, Hong discovers Cheung's undercover identity.

Cast and crew

Cast

Additional crew

Music
The score for The White Storm was composed, orchestrated, conducted and produced by Nicolas Errèra while the theme song, Tacit for Life (心照一生) was composed, arranged and performed by RubberBand, who also co-produced the song it with Benny Chan and co-wrote the lyrics with Tim Lui. The film's insert theme is a cover of the 1978 song, Swear to Enter the Blade Mountain (誓要入刀山), composed by Joseph Koo, with lyrics written by James Wong and performed by Adam Cheng. The cover version was re-arranged and performed by RubberBand.

The score for The White Storm 2: Drug Lords was composed by Mak Chun Hung while the theme song, Brotherhood (兄弟不懷疑) was composed and arranged by Jacky Cai with lyrics written by Andy Lau, who also co-performed the song with Louis Koo, while Jacky Chan produced the song. The film's insert theme song, Wayward One was composed and performed by Jillian Rae, who also wrote the lyrics.

Reception
The first two films were box office successes while receiving mixed reviews. The first film received seven nominations at the 33rd Hong Kong Film Awards while the second film received four nominations at the 39th Hong Kong Film Awards and won the Best Visual Effects award. The second film was also selected as the Hong Kong entry for the Best International Feature Film at the 92nd Academy Awards, but did not make it to the final nomination.

Box office performance

Critical response

Notes

References

Hong Kong film series
Action film series
Film series introduced in 2013
Hong Kong action thriller films
Police detective films
Cantonese-language films
Films set in Hong Kong
Films shot in Hong Kong